Salwick railway station is situated on the -to-Blackpool railway line in England,  west of Preston, and is managed by Northern. The station lies between Preston and Kirkham, near the village of Clifton.

The station was closed on 2 May 1938 along with Lea Road railway station to the east, but was reopened on 8 April 1940 to serve the adjacent industrial complex.

Lancashire County Council has pledged to construct a new station at nearby Cottam which may require the closure of Salwick as referred to at page 38 of the Central Lancashire Highways and Transport Masterplan.

Services
Salwick is served by only three trains towards Preston and three towards Blackpool a day, but it is not a formal request stop; trains are timetabled to stop there.

It is used by very few passengers (as low as 1,404 in 2018–19), but provides a commuter service for the workers at the nearby Springfields Westinghouse nuclear fuel production complex.

Trains do not call at Salwick on Sundays.

Modernisation

The modernisation and electrification of the Preston to Blackpool North line, and hence the station, was announced in December 2009. The modernisation included rebuilding and raising the road bridge in the station vicinity for necessary electrification clearance and completely new signalling of the entire line along with rationalisation of the lines and removal of the spur into the nuclear facility nearby. The removal of the signal box along with four others along the line was included as part of the works. This resulted in a total blockade of the line as far as Kirkham and thus including Salwick station from 11 November 2017 until 29 January 2018.

References

External links

Railway stations in the Borough of Fylde
DfT Category F2 stations
Former Preston and Wyre Joint Railway stations
Railway stations in Great Britain opened in 1840
Railway stations in Great Britain closed in 1938
Railway stations in Great Britain opened in 1940
Northern franchise railway stations